The World Group was the highest level of Davis Cup competition in 2000. The first-round losers went into the Davis Cup World Group Qualifying Round, and the winners progressed to the quarterfinals and were guaranteed a World Group spot for 2001.

Spain won the title, defeating the defending champions Australia in the final, 3–1. The final was held at the Palau Sant Jordi in Barcelona, Spain, from 8 to 10 December. It was the Spanish team's first Davis Cup title.

Participating teams

Draw

First round

Zimbabwe vs. United States

Czech Republic vs. Great Britain

Spain vs. Italy

Russia vs. Belgium

Slovakia vs. Austria

Brazil vs. France

Germany vs. Netherlands

Switzerland vs. Australia

Quarterfinals

United States vs. Czech Republic

Spain vs. Russia

Brazil vs. Slovakia

Australia vs. Germany

Semifinals

Spain vs. United States

Australia vs. Brazil

Final

Spain vs. Australia

References

External links
Davis Cup official website

World Group
Davis Cup World Group
Davis Cup